The 1966 All-Ireland Senior Club Camogie Championship for the leading clubs in the women's team field sport of camogie was won by St Patrick’s Glengoole (from Tipperary, who defeated St Paul’s from Kilkenny in the final, played at St John's Park.

Arrangements
The championship was organised on the traditional provincial system used in Gaelic Games since the 1880s, with Deirdre and Oranmore winning the championships of the other two provinces.

The Final
Glengoole led by a point at half time, and won by 13 points as Anne Carroll scored a notable 2-3 of their total from the deep lying centre back position. Agnes Hourigan wrote in the Irish Press: There was little between the teams in the first half, once the Kilkenny girls had settled down, and the champions half time lead of 1-1 to 1-0 fairly reflected the even trend of the play. In the second half the power of the holders, who fielded nine of the Tipperary county team, told its tale and they had established a winning lead before Kilkenny cut the margin in a late rally.

Provincial stages

Final stages

References

External links
 Camogie Association

1966 in camogie
1966